The city of New Orleans, in the U.S. state of Louisiana, is divided into 17 wards. Politically, the wards are used in voting in elections, subdivided into precincts.  Under various previous city charters of the 19th century, aldermen and later city council members were elected by ward. The city has not had officials elected to represent wards since 1912, but the ward designations remain a part of New Orleans' fabric. Socially, it is not uncommon for New Orleanians from some wards to identify where they are from by their ward number.

History

Most of the boundaries of Wards 1 through 11 were drawn in 1852 when the city was reorganized from three separate municipalities into one centralized government. With various changes, these boundaries remain largely the same, and have not changed at all since the 1880s. The rest of the Wards were formed from the expansion of the city boundaries in the 1870s. The 12th, 13th, and 14th Wards were formed by annexation of land up river from the older city of New Orleans that had been Jefferson City and Greenville; the 15th by the annexation of the city of Algiers, Louisiana across the Mississippi River from the rest of the city, and finally the 16th and 17th Wards formed from the annexed city of Carrollton.

Beginning in the 1980s, residents began to give new cultural meaning to wards as part of their local identity. Extremely prevalent in New Orleans hip hop (particularly Bounce Music), jazz, and other local genres of music, the concepts of "calling out" one's ward (stating the ward of one's residence), and "throwing up" one's ward (holding one's digits on one or both hands to signify their ward) have become mainstays of local culture and are even embraced casually at culturally mainstream events such as the New Orleans Jazz & Heritage Festival. Although this practice is often seen as overly territorial and hostile, sometimes blamed for inciting violence, many simply see it as a friendly camaraderie shared with one's neighborhood.

Uptown wards

 1st Ward
 2nd Ward
 3rd Ward
 10th Ward
 11th Ward
 12th Ward
 13th Ward
 14th Ward
 16th Ward
 17th Ward

Downtown wards
 4th Ward
 5th Ward
 6th Ward
 7th Ward
 8th Ward
 9th Ward

West Bank wards
 15th Ward (Algiers)

Works cited

See also
 Neighborhoods in New Orleans
 Housing Projects of New Orleans

References

External links
Map of the New Orleans ward territories

 
Geography of New Orleans
Neighborhoods in New Orleans